= Nations League Finals =

The Nations League Finals may refer to:

- CONCACAF Nations League Finals
- UEFA Nations League Finals
